Kennard Norman Winchester Jr. (born September 3, 1966) is an American former professional basketball player. He was a 6'5" (1.95 m) 210 lb (95 kg) swingman born in Chestertown, Maryland and played collegiately at Averett University and James Madison University.

Winchester played 107 games for the NBA's Houston Rockets from 1990–93.  He also played briefly for the New York Knicks in 1991-92.

References

1966 births
Living people
American expatriate basketball people in Argentina
American expatriate basketball people in France
American expatriate basketball people in the Philippines
American men's basketball players
Atenas basketball players
Averett University alumni
Basketball players from Maryland
College men's basketball players in the United States
Columbus Horizon players
Houston Rockets players
James Madison Dukes men's basketball players
Le Mans Sarthe Basket players
Magnolia Hotshots players
New York Knicks players
Olimpia de Venado Tuerto basketball players
People from Chestertown, Maryland
Philippine Basketball Association imports
Rapid City Thrillers players
Shooting guards
Small forwards
Undrafted National Basketball Association players